Enrica von Handel-Mazzetti (10 January 1871 – 8 April 1955) was an Austrian poet and writer, known for writing historical romances, notably Die Hochzeit von Quedlinburg.

Life

Enrica Freifrau von Handel-Mazzetti was born in Vienna in 1871 and her father, Baron Heinrich Hypolith of Handel-Mazzetti, died young before her birth. She was educated well, studying history and languages. After her mother died, she went to live with a bachelor uncle, Baron Anton von Handel-Mazzetti, in Steyr in 1901. Her cousin was the botanist Heinrich von Handel-Mazzetti. She moved with her uncle to Linz when he was promoted in 1911. This was in the middle of her most productive period when her books were being serialised in magazines as well as being published and enthusiastically received.

She stayed in Linz for the rest of her life, notably joining a protest against book burning in 1933.  The following year she nearly died from an untreatable eye condition.

When 25 members of the PEN Club passed a resolution to protest the Nazi book burnings, Enrica von Handel-Mazzetti and other nationalist, racist and catholic authors did not agree and quit the Club.

Enrica von Handel-Mazzetti was a member of the Reich Chamber of Literature (part of the Reich Chamber of Culture).

Her work was not encouraged by the Nazi regime, although she stayed in Linz, apart from when the bombing was really bad when she briefly moved to Elisabethinen in 1944.

von Handel-Mazzetti died in Linz in 1955.

Legacy
Apart from her published novels and poetry there is a street that was named for her in 1931 in Steyr and another street was named after her in Vienna in 1981. There was also an Austrian postage stamp that celebrated her life.

References

External links
 

1871 births
1955 deaths
Writers from Vienna
Austrian women novelists
Austrian romantic fiction writers
Austrian historical novelists
Women romantic fiction writers
Women historical novelists